Port Loko Teacher's College is a college located in Port Loko, Sierra Leone. It was founded in 1968. The college trains prospective teachers for the primary and junior secondary school levels (form 1–3). At the end of the program, candidates qualify for the Teachers Certificate (TC) and the Higher Teachers Certificate (HTC).  The college offers programmes in English studies, social studies, environmental science, agriculture and Mathematics education. The school campus has a volleyball court, a table tennis court, a football field and a Swimming pool.

Current programmes
 School of Community Health Services
 School of Social Sciences
 School of Agriculture
 School of Environmental Sciences
 School of Technology
 School of Business Management
 School of Social Studies

External links
https://web.archive.org/web/20071013173243/http://www.fighthunger.org/en/wtw06/port_loko_town_in_port_loko_district

Universities and colleges in Sierra Leone